William McColl is an American clarinetist and professor of music.

Education
His primary teachers have included Leopold Wlach at the Akademie für Musik und darstellende Kunst in Vienna (known from 1970  to 1998 as the Hochschule für Musik and today as the Universität für Musik) as well as Keith Stein, George Waln and Herbert Blayman.

Career

He played clarinet with the U.S. Seventh Army Symphony Orchestra, Philharmonia Hungarica, the Puerto Rico Symphony Orchestra and was a featured performer at the Casals Festival in Puerto Rico. As a specialist in early clarinets and basset horns, he has done international tours, recordings and concert appearances with the Amadeus Winds, the Philharmonia Baroque Orchestra, and the Boston Handel and Haydn Society, among others. He was professor of clarinet at the University of Washington from 1968 to 2006.

He is a founding member of the Soni Ventorum Wind Quintet and of the New World Basset Horn Trio. He has recorded solo and chamber works on Musical Heritage, and Crystal labels (with the Soni Ventorum), as well as on the Atlantic, Decca and Harmonia Mundi labels.

McColl has been heralded as a "superb clarinetist", "graceful" and "virtuosic and full of life".

References 

American clarinetists
21st-century clarinetists
Year of birth missing (living people)
Living people